Christine Hocq (born August 12, 1970 in Casablanca, Morocco) is an athlete from France, who competes in triathlon.

Nicknamed "Titi", Hocq competed at the first Olympic triathlon at the 2000 Summer Olympics.  She took eighth place with a total time of 2:03:01.90.  Her split times were 19:43.78 for the swim, 1:05:33.90 for the cycling, and 0:37:44.22 for the run.

References

1970 births
Living people
French female triathletes
Triathletes at the 2000 Summer Olympics
Olympic triathletes of France
Sportspeople from Casablanca